Weyakwin is a northern hamlet in Northern Saskatchewan.

Name 

The name of the community comes from the Cree language, meaning Foul or profane language.

The community is known in Cree as ᐏᔭᐦᑵᐏᓂᕽ wiyahkwêwinihk.

Demographics 

See also 
 List of communities in Northern Saskatchewan
 List of communities in Saskatchewan

References

Division No. 18, Saskatchewan
Northern hamlets in Saskatchewan